Laskowa may refer to:
 Laskowa, Lower Silesian Voivodeship (south-west Poland)
 Laskowa, Limanowa County in Lesser Poland Voivodeship (south Poland)
 Laskowa, Oświęcim County in Lesser Poland Voivodeship (south Poland)
 Laskowa, Świętokrzyskie Voivodeship (south-central Poland)

See also
 Lasków (disambiguation)